A protein synthesis inhibitor is a compound that stops or slows the growth or proliferation of cells by disrupting the processes that lead directly to the generation of new proteins.

While a broad interpretation of this definition could be used to describe nearly any compound depending on concentration, in practice, it usually refers to compounds that act at the molecular level on translational machinery (either the ribosome itself or the translation factor), taking advantages of the major differences between prokaryotic and eukaryotic ribosome structures.

Mechanism
In general, protein synthesis inhibitors work at different stages of bacterial mRNA translation into proteins, like initiation, elongation (including aminoacyl tRNA entry, proofreading, peptidyl transfer, and bacterial translocation) and termination:

Earlier stages
 Rifamycin inhibits bacterial DNA transcription into mRNA by inhibiting DNA-dependent RNA polymerase by binding its beta-subunit.
 alpha-Amanitin is a powerful inhibitor of eukaryotic DNA transcription machinery.

Initiation
 Linezolid acts at the initiation stage, probably by preventing the formation of the initiation complex, although the mechanism is not fully understood.

Ribosome assembly 
 Aminoglycosides prevent ribosome assembly by binding to the bacterial 30S ribosomal subunit.

Aminoacyl tRNA entry
 Tetracyclines and Tigecycline (a glycylcycline related to tetracyclines) block the A site on the ribosome, preventing the binding of aminoacyl tRNAs.

Proofreading
 Aminoglycosides, among other potential mechanisms of action, interfere with the proofreading process, causing increased rate of error in synthesis with premature termination.

Peptidyl transfer
 Chloramphenicol blocks the peptidyl transfer step of elongation on the 50S ribosomal subunit in both bacteria and mitochondria.
Macrolides (as well as inhibiting ribosomal translocation and other potential mechanisms) bind to the 50s ribosomal subunits, inhibiting peptidyl transfer.
 Quinupristin/dalfopristin act synergistically, with dalfopristin, enhancing the binding of quinupristin, as well as inhibiting peptidyl transfer. Quinupristin binds to a nearby site on the 50S ribosomal subunit and prevents elongation of the polypeptide, as well as causing incomplete chains to be released.
 Geneticin, also called G418, inhibits the elongation step in both prokaryotic and eukaryotic ribosomes.
 Trichothecene mycotoxins are potent and non selective inhibitors of peptide elongation.

Ribosomal translocation
 Macrolides, clindamycin and aminoglycosides (with all these three having other potential mechanisms of action as well), have evidence of inhibition of ribosomal translocation.
 Fusidic acid prevents the turnover of elongation factor G (EF-G) from the ribosome.
 Ricin inhibits elongation by enzymatically modifying an rRNA of the eukaryotic 60S ribosomal subunit.

Termination
 Macrolides and clindamycin (both also having other potential mechanisms) cause premature dissociation of the peptidyl-tRNA from the ribosome.
 Puromycin has a structure similar to that of the tyrosinyl aminoacyl-tRNA. Thus, it binds to the ribosomal A site and participates in peptide bond formation, producing peptidyl-puromycin. However, it does not engage in translocation and quickly dissociates from the ribosome, causing a premature termination of polypeptide synthesis.
Streptogramins also cause premature release of the peptide chain.

Protein synthesis inhibitors of unspecified mechanism
Retapamulin
Mupirocin
Fusidic acid

Binding site
The following antibiotics bind to the 30S subunit of the ribosome:
Aminoglycosides 
Tetracyclines

The following antibiotics bind to the 50S ribosomal subunit:
Chloramphenicol
Clindamycin
Linezolid (an oxazolidinone)
Macrolides
Telithromycin
Streptogramins
Retapamulin

See also

 Protein biosynthesis
 Bacterial translation
 Eukaryotic translation
 Archaeal translation

References

Protein biosynthesis
Protein synthesis inhibitor antibiotics